Crotalus viridis (Common names: prairie rattlesnake, Great Plains rattlesnake,) is a venomous pit viper species native to the western United States, southwestern Canada, and northern Mexico. Currently, two subspecies are recognized, including the prairie rattlesnake (Crotalus viridis viridis), the nominate subspecies, and the Hopi rattlesnake (Crotalus viridis nuntius).

Taxonomy
The taxonomic history of this species is convoluted. Previously, seven other C. viridis subspecies were also recognized, including C. v. abyssus, C. v. caliginis, C. v. cerberus, C. v. concolor, C. v. helleri, C. v. lutosus and C. v. oreganus. However, in 2001 Ashton and de Queiroz described their analysis of the variation of mitochondrial DNA across the range of this species. Their results agreed broadly with those obtained by Pook et al. (2000). Two main clades were identified, east and west of the Rocky Mountains, which they argued were actually two different species: on the one hand C. viridis, including the conventional subspecies C. v. viridis and C. v. nuntius, and on the other C. oreganus, including all the other traditional subspecies of C. viridis. The authors retained the names of the traditional subspecies, but emphasized the need for more work to be done on the systematics of C. oreganus.

Description

In Montana, specimens occasionally exceed  in length; the species reaches its maximum size in this region. One of the most characteristic features is the presence of three or more, usually four, internasal scales.

Identification characteristics will vary depending on which subspecies is encountered.  Generally, prairie rattlesnakes are usually lightly colored in hues of brown.  Patches of dark brown are often distributed in a dorsal pattern.  A color band may be seen at the back of the eye.  The prairie rattlesnake group carries the distinctive triangle-shaped head and pit sensory organs on either side of the head.  A key characteristic that can help differentiate a prairie rattlesnake from other rattlesnakes is the presence of two internasals contacting the rostral.

Distribution and habitat

Prairie rattlesnakes are found in North America over much of the Great Plains, the eastern foothills and some intermontane valleys of the Rocky Mountains, from southwestern Canada through the United States to northern Mexico. In Canada, they occur in Alberta and Saskatchewan; in the US in eastern Idaho, most of Montana (where it is one of 10 snake species and the only venomous one), North Dakota, South Dakota, Wyoming, Nebraska, Colorado, Kansas, Oklahoma, Texas, New Mexico, northeastern Arizona, extreme western Iowa, and in Mexico in northern Coahuila and northwestern Chihuahua.

Wright and Wright (1957) and Klauber (1997) both mention Utah as within the range of this species, including maps showing it confined to the extreme southeastern part of the state. The type locality is described as "the Upper Missouri [Valley, USA]". An emendation was proposed by H.M. Smith and Taylor (1950) to "Gross, Boyd County, Nebraska."

Habitat characteristics can vary depending on subspecies and range. Generally, western rattlesnakes occupy areas with an abundant prey base. Many subspecies occupy somewhat rocky areas with outcrops serving as den sites. Prairie rattlesnakes have also been known to occupy burrows of other animals. They seem to prefer dry areas with moderate vegetation coverage. Vegetation cover will vary depending on region and subspecies.

Behavior

Prairie rattlesnakes are primarily terrestrial, but occasionally climb in trees or bushes. Some even rest in crevices or caves. They are typically active diurnally in cooler weather and nocturnally during hot weather C. viridis. This species complex is equipped with powerful venom, using about 20-55 percent of venom in one bite, and will defend themselves if threatened or injured. As with other rattlesnake species, prairie rattlesnakes will rapidly vibrate their tails, which produces a unique rasping sound to warn intruders. Prairie rattlesnakes prefer sinuosity while migrating even in human-dominated environments because it leads to a higher chance of survival and better body condition throughout and after migration.

The venom of the Prairie rattlesnake is a complexly structured mixture of different proteins with enzymes such as proteases and peptidases found among them. Besides the hemotoxin and its tissue destructive effect, the venom also has neurotoxic properties.

Diet 
Prairie rattlesnakes, because of their expansive distribution, have a wide array of prey. Generally, this species prefers small mammals, such as ground squirrels, ground nesting birds, mice, rats, small rabbits and prairie dogs. They will occasionally feed on amphibians and reptiles, and sometimes even other snakes. This is more commonly seen in juvenile snakes.

Reproduction

Prairie rattlesnakes are viviparous and can produce from one to 25 young per reproduction event. The average number of young ranges from four to 12, but can vary greatly due to availability of food and environmental conditions. Males may compete for females during the breeding season, but western rattlesnake females may not necessarily breed every year. They give birth in late summer or early fall, being their breed 22–28 cm long, without the need for parental care. In addition, the young are toxic as soon as they are born. They reach sexual maturity at three years of age. It is also common for females to give birth at communal den sites with the young born between August and October.

Conservation status
This species is classified as Least Concern on the IUCN Red List of Threatened Species (v3.1, 2001). Species are listed as such due to their wide distribution, presumed large population, or because they are unlikely to be declining fast enough to qualify for listing in a more threatened category. The population trend was stable when assessed in 2006.

Subspecies
Crotalus viridis nuntius ,
the Hopi rattlesnake, inhabits the United States from northeastern and north-central Arizona, from the New Mexico border to Cataract Creek, including the Little Colorado River basin, the southern section of the Apache Indian Reservation, the Hopi Reservation, and the Coconino Plateau from the southern rim of the Grand Canyon to US Highway 66 in the south.

Crotalus viridis viridis , the prairie rattlesnake, inhabits the North American Great Plains from the Rocky Mountains to 96° W and from southern Canada to extreme northern Mexico, including southwestern Saskatchewan, southeastern Alberta, eastern Washington, Idaho in the Lemhi Valley, Montana east of the higher Rockies, southwestern North Dakota, west, central and extreme southeastern South Dakota, western Iowa, central and western Nebraska, Wyoming except for the Rockies, Colorado, central and western Kansas, Oklahoma, extreme southeastern Utah, northeastern Arizona, New Mexico, western and southwestern Texas, northeastern Sonora, northern Chihuahua, northern Coahuila.

See also
 Snakebite

References

Further reading
Ashton KG, de Queiroz A. 2001. "Molecular systematics of the Western Rattlesnake, Crotalus viridis (Viperidae), with comments on the utility of the D-Loop in phylogenetic studies of snakes". Molecular Phylogenetics and Evolution 21 (2): 176-189.
Behler JL, King FW. 1979. The Audubon Society Field Guide to North American Reptiles and Amphibians. New York: Alfred A. Knopf. 743 pp. . (Crotalus viridis, pp. 694–695 + Plates 621, 623, 627, 629-631, 648).
Conant R. 1975. A Field Guide to Reptiles and Amphibians of Eastern and Central North America, Second Edition. Boston: Houghton Mifflin. xviii + 429 pp. + Plates 1-48.  (hardcover),  (paperback). (Crotalus viridis, p. 237 + Plate 36 + Map 179).
Conant R, Bridges W. 1939. What Snake Is That?: A Field Guide to the Snakes of the United States East of the Rocky Mountains.  (With 108 drawings by Edmond Malnate). New York and London: D. Appleton-Century. Frontispiece map + viii + 163 pp. + Plates A-C, 1-32. (Crotalus viridis, pp. 154–155 + Plate 32, Figure 91).
Hubbs, Brian; O'Connor, Brendan. 2012. A Guide to the Rattlesnakes and other Venomous Serpents of the United States. Tempe, Arizona: Tricolor Books. 129 pp. . (Crotalus viridis nuntius, pp. 36–37, 111; C. v. viridis, pp. 38–39).
Rafinesque CS. 1818. "Further Accounts of Discoveries in Natural History, in the Western States". American Monthly Magazine and Critical Review 4 (5): 39-42. ("N. Sp. Crotalinus viridis ", p. 41).
Schmidt KP, Davis DD. 1941. Field Book of Snakes of the United States and Canada. New York: G.P. Putnam's Sons. 365 pp. (Crotalus viridis, pp. 308–311, Figure 102 (map) + Plate 34).
Smith HM, Brodie ED Jr. 1982. Reptiles of North America: A Guide to Field Identification. New York: Golden Press. 240 pp. . (Crotalus viridis, pp. 204–205).

External links
 
 Prairie Rattlesnake, Reptiles and Amphibians of Iowa
 
 

viridis
Reptiles of the United States
Fauna of the Western United States
Fauna of the Rocky Mountains
Reptiles described in 1818
Taxa named by Constantine Samuel Rafinesque